Birgitte N. Husebye (born 25 October 1973) is a Norwegian orienteering competitor. She is Relay World Champion from 1999, and has three bronze medals from the 2001, 2003 and 2004 World Orienteering Championships.

References

External links
 
 

1973 births
Living people
Norwegian orienteers
Female orienteers
Foot orienteers
World Orienteering Championships medalists
Junior World Orienteering Championships medalists
World Games medalists in orienteering
World Games gold medalists
World Games bronze medalists
Competitors at the 2001 World Games